The 10th Empire Awards ceremony (officially known as the Sony Ericsson Empire Awards), presented by the British film magazine Empire, honored the best films of 2004 and took place on 13 March 2005 at the Guildhall in London, England. During the ceremony, Empire presented Empire Awards in 10 categories as well as four honorary awards. The honorary Outstanding Contribution to British Cinema award was first introduced this year. To celebrate the 10th anniversary of the award ceremonies a special honorary award was presented, the Icon of the Decade award. The awards for Best British Actor, Best British Actress and Best British Director as well as the honorary Independent Spirit award were presented for the last time. This was the first year the Lifetime Achievement Award was not presented. The ceremony was televised in the United Kingdom by Channel 5 on 15 March. English television presenter and radio presenter Johnny Vaughan hosted the show for the first time. The awards were sponsored by Sony Ericsson for the third consecutive year.

The Bourne Supremacy won the most awards with two including Best Film. Other winners included Before Sunset, Dead Man's Shoes, Enduring Love, Eternal Sunshine of the Spotless Mind, Finding Neverland, Layer Cake, Spider-Man 2 and Shaun of the Dead with one. Pixar received the Empire Inspiration Award, Kevin Smith received the Independent Spirit Award, Working Title Films received the Outstanding Contribution to British Cinema Award and Quentin Tarantino received the special honorary 10th anniversary Icon of the Decade award.

Winners and nominees
Winners are listed first and highlighted in boldface.

Multiple awards
The following film received multiple awards:

Multiple nominations
The following 11 films received multiple nominations:

References

External links
 
 

Empire Award ceremonies
2004 film awards
2005 in British cinema
2005 in London
March 2005 events in the United Kingdom